Tirley is a village and civil parish in Gloucestershire, England. The village is situated on a low limestone ridge just above the flood plain of the River Severn. It is on the B4213 road, half a mile west of Haw Bridge, a crossing point on the Severn since the 13th century.

The parish population at the 2011 census was 428.

It has a parish church dedicated to St Michael and All Angels.

References

External links

Villages in Gloucestershire